Murray Art Museum Albury (abbreviated MAMA) is a contemporary art museum located in Albury, Australia. Formerly known as the Albury Regional Art Gallery it was renamed as part of a $10.5 million refurbishment which included renovations to the former gallery building, the neighbouring burrows house and the extensions linking and extending both buildings into QEII Square. Space in MAMA has extended from 832m² to 2036m² and has 10 gallery spaces over two levels. The building was designed by architect firm NBRS and Partners.

On the north facing terrace of the museum is Canvas Eatery, a restaurant operated by Tim Tehan. Canvas offers relaxed modern cuisine overlooking QEII Square.

Collection
The museum manages the art collection of Albury City Council, an extensive collection of over 2800 items.
Early acquisitions to the collection were drawn from the Albury Art Prize, which was established in 1947.
The founding of the National Photography Prize in 1983 encouraged a new focus on contemporary Australian photography, building on some earlier acquisitions. The National Photography Prize continues to the present day and continues to be a key source of acquisitions. The photography collection comprise over 600 works and is one of the most important of its kind in Australia. It includes works by Tracey Moffatt, Max Dupain, Richard Woldendorp, Michael Riley, Destiny Deacon, Olive Cotton, Justine Varga and Phillip Quirk. 

Other highlights in the permanent collection include works by Russell Drysdale, Margaret Olley, Patrick Hartigan, Lorraine Connelly-Northey, Brook Garru Andrew, and Hany Armanious.

Exhibitions
Murray Art Museum Albury opened on October 2, 2015, with the exhibition Wiradjuri Ngurambanggu (On Wiradjuri Country) and featured the work of contemporary indigenous artists Jonathan Jones, Brook Andrew, Lorraine Connelly-Northey, Karla Dickens and Nicole Foreshew.

Major exhibitions have included:

 Impressions of Paris: Lautrec, Degas, Daumier (12 December 2015 - 31 January 2016)
 Marilyn: Celebrating an American Icon (12 February 2016 - 8 May 2016)
 MAMA Art Foundation National Photography Prize 2016 (21 May 2016 - 7 August 2016)
 SPEED: The Fast and the Curious (20 August 2016 - 6 November 2016)
 MAMA Summer Pop (18 November 2016 - 22 January 2017)
 Yours. Celebrating 70 years of collecting (3 February 2017 - 17 April 2017)
 Being Tiwi & Primavera at 25 (28 April 2017 - 25 June 2017)
 Yao Jui-Chung + Lost Society Document + Sandy Hsiu-Chih Lo: Mirage: Disused Public Property in Taiwan (7 July 2017 - 17 September 2017)
 Landmarks (29 September 2017 - 3 December 2017)
 2017 Archibald Prize (15 December 2017 - 28 January 2018)
 Material Sound (9 February 2018 - 29 April 2018)
 MAMA Art Foundation National Photography Prize 2018 (10 May 2018 - 22 July 2018)
 Immortality
 Sidney Nolan's Ned Kelly series
 John Mawurndjul: I am the old and the new
 Zzzzz: Sleep, somnambulism, madness
 Certain realities
 Pets
 National Photography Prize 2020
 COLLECTION
 20:20
 Notes from the Field: Bogong Centre for Sound Culture
 Choose Happiness
 SIMMER
 National Photography Prize 2022

Programs

The museum is a significant commissioner of new artworks by contemporary Australian artists, as well as supporting new commissions by arts writers, independent curators and partnerships with other cultural organisations locally and nationally.

Murray Art Museum Albury hosts a full suite of art education programs, workshops, and short courses for children and adults. These studio art programs are held year-round and take place in the education suite within the museum.

The museum is well utilised by school groups, preschools, and other education providers as a destination for tours, excursions and studio art sessions.

A range of monthly club meet ups are hosted at the museum, as well as exhibition openings, artist talks and art events linked to the exhibition program.

Philanthropy
Murray Art Museum Albury is supported by an independent fundraising organisation, the MAMA Art Foundation. The Foundation is the primary supporter of the biennial National Photography Prize, as well as providing funds for the acquisition of new work for the permanent collection.

See also
 Albury Library Museum

References

Contemporary art galleries in Australia